Dyjan Carlos de Azevedo (born 23 June 1991), known as Dyjan, is a Brazilian professional footballer who plays for Spartak Trnava as a winger. He previously played for Baník Ostrava.

Honours
Spartak Trnava
Slovnaft Cup: 2021–22

References

External links
Eurofotbal profile

1991 births
Living people
Footballers from São Paulo (state)
Brazilian footballers
Association football midfielders
Budapest Honvéd FC players
FK Bodva Moldava nad Bodvou players
Partizán Bardejov players
FC Baník Ostrava players
Paris FC players
FC Spartak Trnava players
Nemzeti Bajnokság II players
Czech First League players
Ligue 2 players
2. Liga (Slovakia) players
Slovak Super Liga players
Brazilian expatriate sportspeople in Hungary
Expatriate footballers in Hungary
Brazilian expatriate sportspeople in Slovakia
Expatriate footballers in Slovakia
Brazilian expatriate sportspeople in the Czech Republic
Expatriate footballers in the Czech Republic